The FIL World Luge Championships 1959 took place in Villard-de-Lans, France. The men's doubles event was cancelled to poor weather conditions. It was the first time an event has been entirely cancelled in the history of the World Championships, European Championships, or Winter Olympics, but its happened again at the World Championships 2011.

Men's singles

Women's singles

Men's doubles
The event was cancelled due to weather conditions.

Medal table

References
Men's doubles World Champions
Men's singles World Champions
Women's singles World Champions

FIL World Luge Championships
1959 in luge
1959 in French sport
Luge in France